Broglen River is a  river in Cullman County, Alabama.  Broglen River originates at  near Hanceville, and discharges into the Mulberry Fork River at  near Chamblees Mill.

References

Rivers of Alabama
Rivers of Cullman County, Alabama